Crotalus ravus, commonly known as the Mexican pigmy rattlesnake or Mexican pygmy rattlesnake, is a venomous pit viper species, found only in Mexico. Three subspecies are currently recognized.

Taxonomy
A study using mitochondrial DNA strongly suggests that C. ravus is part of a species complex including Crotalus triseriatus, Crotalus pusillus, Crotalus aquilus, and Crotalus lepidus. This study also confirmed strong genetic differentiation among the three subspecies aligning with geographic barriers. A follow-up study using seven nuclear markers places S. ravus basal to all other members of the species complex.

Subspecies

Description
They are moderately stout in build.

The distinguishing characteristics for the nominate subspecies C. r. ravus include parietal scales that are highly variable in shape and particularly large, less than 3 prefoveals, 21 midbody dorsal scales, 2–4 tail bands and a relatively large rattle.

Distribution
Found only in Mexico in the mountains in the center and south of the country, west of the Isthmus of Tehuantepec. Its range includes the southeastern part of the Mexican Plateau in the highlands of Mexico, Morelos, Tlaxcala, Puebla, Veracruz, Oaxaca, and the Sierra Madre del Sur in Guerrero. The type locality given is the "Table land of Mexico." Cochran (1961) interpreted this to be the "south tableland, Veracruz, Mexico."

Campbell and Lamar (2004) describe this species as being found across the Mexican Plateau in the temperate regions of moderate to high elevations.

Conservation
Although being listed as of "Least Concern" by the IUCN, C. ravus was listed as "threatened" by the Mexican government in 2010.

References

ravus
Reptiles of Mexico
Reptiles described in 1865